A magazine is an ammunition storage and feeding device for a repeating firearm, either integral within the gun (internal/fixed magazine) or externally attached (detachable magazine).  The magazine functions by holding several cartridges within itself and sequentially pushing each one into a position where it may be readily loaded into the barrel chamber by the firearm's moving action.  The detachable magazine is sometimes colloquially referred to as a "clip", although this is technically inaccurate since a clip is actually an accessory device used to help load ammunition into a magazine.

Magazines come in many shapes and sizes, from tubular magazines on lever-action and pump-action firearms that may tandemly hold several rounds, to detachable box and drum magazines for automatic rifles and light machine guns that may hold more than one hundred rounds. Various jurisdictions ban what they define as "high-capacity magazines".

Nomenclature

With the increased use of semi-automatic and automatic firearms, the detachable magazine became increasingly common.  Soon after the adoption of the M1911 pistol, the term "magazine" was settled on by the military and firearms experts, though the term "clip" is often used  in its place (though only for detachable magazines, never fixed).  The defining difference between clips and magazines is the presence of a feed mechanism in a magazine, typically a spring-loaded follower, which a clip lacks. A magazine has four parts as follows: a spring, a spring follower, a body and a base. A clip may be made of one continuous piece of stamped metal and have no moving parts. Examples of clips are moon clips for revolvers; "stripper" clips such as what is used for military 5.56 ammo, in association with a speedloader; or the en bloc clip for M1 Garand rifles, among others. Use of the term "clip" to refer to detachable magazines is a point of strong disagreement.

History

The earliest firearms were loaded with loose powder and a lead ball, and to fire more than a single shot without reloading required multiple barrels, such as in pepper-box guns, double-barreled rifles, double-barreled shotguns, or multiple chambers, such as in revolvers. Both of these add bulk and weight over a single barrel and a single chamber, however, and many attempts were made to get multiple shots from a single loading of a single barrel through the use of superposed loads. While some early repeaters such as the Kalthoff repeater managed to operate using complex systems with multiple feed sources for ball, powder and primer, easily mass-produced repeating mechanisms did not appear until self-contained cartridges were developed.

First tubular

The first successful mass-produced repeating weapon to use a "tubular magazine" permanently mounted to the weapon was the Austrian Army's Girandoni air rifle, first produced in 1779.

The first mass-produced repeating firearm was the Volcanic Rifle which used a hollow bullet with the base filled with powder and primer fed into the chamber from a tube called a "magazine" with an integral spring to push the cartridges in to the action, thence to be loaded into the chamber and fired. It was named after a building or room used to store ammunition. The anemic power of the Rocket Ball ammunition used in the Volcanic doomed it to limited popularity..

The Henry repeating rifle is a lever-action, breech-loading, tubular magazine fed rifle, and was an improved version of the earlier Volcanic rifle. Designed by Benjamin Tyler Henry in 1860, it was one of the first firearms to use self-contained metallic cartridges. The Henry was introduced in 1860 and produced through 1866 in the United States by the New Haven Arms Company. It was adopted in small quantities by the Union in the Civil War and favored for its greater firepower than the standard issue carbine. Many later found their way West and was famed both for its use at the Battle of the Little Bighorn, and being the basis for the iconic Winchester rifle which is still made to this day. The Henry and Winchester rifles would go on to see service with a number of militaries including Turkey. Switzerland and Italy adopted similar designs.

The second magazine-fed firearm to achieve widespread success was the Spencer repeating rifle, which saw service in the American Civil War. The Spencer used a tubular magazine located in the butt of the gun instead of under the barrel and it used new rimfire metallic cartridges. The Spencer was successful, but the rimfire ammunition did occasionally ignite in the magazine tube and destroy the magazine. It could also injure the user.

The new bolt-action rifles began to gain favor with militaries in the 1880s and were often equipped with tubular magazines. The Mauser Model 1871 was originally a single-shot action that added a tubular magazine in its 1884 update. The Norwegian Jarmann M1884 was adopted in 1884 and also used a tubular magazine. The French Lebel Model 1886 rifle also used 8-round tubular magazine.

Integral box

The military cartridge was evolving as the magazine rifle evolved. Cartridges evolved from large-bore cartridges (.40 caliber/10 mm and larger) to smaller bores that fired lighter, higher-velocity bullets and incorporated new smokeless propellants. The Lebel Model 1886 rifle was the first rifle and cartridge to be designed for use with smokeless powder and used an 8 mm wadcutter-shaped bullet that was drawn from a tubular magazine. This would later become a problem when the Lebel's ammunition was updated to use a more aerodynamic pointed bullet. Modifications had to be made to the centerfire case to prevent the spitzer point from igniting the primer of the next cartridge inline in the magazine through recoil or simply rough handling. This remains a concern with lever-action firearms today.

Two early box magazine patents were the ones by Rollin White in 1855 and William Harding in 1859. A detachable box magazine was patented in 1864 by the American Robert Wilson. Unlike later box magazines this magazine fed into a tube magazine and was located in the stock of the gun. Another box magazine, closer to the modern type, was patented in Britain (No. 483) by Mowbray Walker, George Henry Money and Francis Little in 1867. James Paris Lee patented a box magazine which held rounds stacked vertically in 1879 and 1882 and it was first adopted by Austria in the form of an 11mm straight-pull bolt-action rifle, the Mannlicher M1886. It also used a cartridge clip which held 5 rounds ready to load into the magazine.

The bolt-action Krag–Jørgensen rifle, designed in Norway in 1886, used a unique rotary magazine that was built into the receiver. Like Lee's box magazine, the rotary magazine held the rounds side-by-side, rather than end-to-end. Like most rotary magazines, it was loaded through a loading gate one round at a time, this one located on the side of the receiver. While reliable, the Krag–Jørgensen's magazine was expensive to produce and slow to reload. It was adopted by only three countries, Denmark in 1889, the United States in 1892, and Norway in 1894.

Clip-fed revolution

A clip (called chargers in the United Kingdom) is a device that is used to store multiple rounds of ammunition together as a unit, ready for insertion into the magazine or cylinder of a firearm. This speeds up the process of loading and reloading the firearm as several rounds can be loaded at once, rather than one round being loaded at a time. Several different types of clips exist, most of which are made of inexpensive metal stampings that are designed to be disposable, though they are often re-used.

The first clips used were of the en bloc variety, developed by Ferdinand Mannlicher and first adopted by the Austro-Hungarian Army, which would be used Austro-Hungarians during the first world war in the form of the Mannlicher M1895, derivatives of which would be adopted by many national militaries. The Germans used this system for their Model 1888 Commission Rifle, featuring a 5-round en bloc clip-fed internal box magazine. One problem with the en bloc system is that the firearm cannot be practically used without a ready supply of (mosty disposable) clips. Paul Mauser would solve this problem by introducing a stripper clip that functioned only to assist the user in loading the magazine quickly: it was not required to load the magazine to full capacity. He would continue to make improved models of rifles that took advantage of this new clip design from 1889 through 1898 in various calibers that proved enormously successful, and were adopted by a wide range of national militaries. In 1890 the French adopted the 8mm Lebel Berthier rifles with 3-round internal magazines, fed from en bloc clips; the empty clips were pushed from the bottom of the action by the insertion of a loaded clip from the top.

In the late 1800s there were many short-lived designs, such as the M1895 Lee Navy and Gewehr 1888, eventually replaced by the M1903 Springfield rifle and Gewehr 98 respectively. The Russian Mosin–Nagant, adopted in 1891, was an exception. It was not revolutionary; it was a bolt-action rifle, used a small-bore smokeless powder cartridge, and a fixed box magazine loaded from the top with stripper clips, all of which were features that were used in earlier military rifles. What made the Nagant stand out was that it combined all the earlier features in a form that was to last virtually unchanged from its issue by Russia in 1894 through World War II and with its sniper rifle variants still in use today.

Magazine cut-off

An interesting feature of many late 19th- and early 20th-century bolt-action rifles was the magazine cut-off, sometimes called a feed interrupter. This was a mechanical device that prevented the rifle from loading a round from the magazine, requiring the shooter to manually load each individual round as he fired, saving the rounds in the magazine for short periods of rapid fire when ordered to use them. Most military authorities that specified them assumed that their riflemen would waste ammunition indiscriminately if allowed to load from the magazine all the time.  By the mid-20th century, most manufacturers deleted this feature to save costs and manufacturing time; it is also likely that battlefield experience had proven the futility of this philosophy.

Final fixed-magazine developments

One of the last new clip-fed, fixed-magazine rifles widely adopted that was not a modification of an earlier rifle was the M1 Garand. The first semi-automatic rifle that was issued in large numbers to the infantry, the Garand was fed by a special eight-round en bloc clip. The clip itself was inserted into the rifle's magazine during loading, where it was locked in place. The rounds were fed directly from the clip, with a spring-loaded follower in the rifle pushing the rounds up into feeding position. When empty, the bolt would lock open, and a spring would automatically eject the empty clip with a distinctive pinging sound, leaving the rifle ready to be reloaded. The M14 rifle, which was based on incremental changes to the Garand action, switched to a detachable box magazine. However, the M14 with magazine attached could also be loaded via 5-round stripper-clips.

The Soviet SKS carbine, which entered service in 1945, was something of a stopgap between the semi-automatic service rifles being developed in the period leading up to World War II, and the new assault rifle developed by the Germans. The SKS used a fixed magazine, holding ten rounds and fed by a conventional stripper clip. It was a modification of the earlier AVS-36 rifle, shortened and chambered for the new reduced power 7.62×39mm cartridge. It was rendered obsolete for military use almost immediately by the 1947 introduction of the magazine-fed AK-47 assault rifle, though it remained in service for many years in Soviet Bloc nations alongside the AK-47. The detachable magazine quickly came to dominate post-war military rifle designs.

Detachable box magazines

Firearms using detachable magazines are made with an opening known as a magazine well into which the detachable magazine is inserted. The magazine well locks the magazine in position for feeding cartridges into the chamber of the firearm, and requires a device known as a magazine release to allow the magazine to be separated from the firearm.

The Lee–Metford rifle, developed in 1888, was one of the first rifles to use a detachable box magazine, and the spare one could be optionally worn on soldier equipment, although with the adoption of the Short Magazine Lee–Enfield Mk I this became only detachable for cleaning and not swapped to reload the weapon. However, the first completely modern removable box magazine was patented in 1908 by Arthur Savage for the Savage Model 99 (1899), although it was not implemented on the 99 until 1965. Other guns did not adopt all of its features until his patent expired in 1942: It has shoulders to retain cartridges when it is removed from the rifle. It operates reliably with cartridges of different lengths. It is insertable and removable at any time with any number of cartridges. These features allow the operator to reload the gun infrequently, carry magazines rather than loose cartridges, and to easily change the types of cartridges in the field. The magazine is assembled from inexpensive stamped sheet metal. It also includes a crucial safety feature for hunting dangerous game: when empty the follower stops the bolt from engaging the chamber, informing the operator that the gun is empty before any attempt to fire.

The first successful semi-automatic pistol was the Borchardt C-93 (1893) and incorporated detachable box magazines. Nearly all subsequent semiautomatic pistol designs adopted detachable box magazines.

The Swiss Army evaluated the Luger pistol using a detachable box magazine in 7.65×21mm Parabellum and adopted it in 1900 as its standard sidearm. The Luger pistol was accepted by the Imperial German Navy in 1904. This version is known as Pistole 04 (or P.04). In 1908 the German Army adopted the Luger to replace the Reichsrevolver in front-line service. The Pistole 08 (or P.08) was chambered in 9×19mm Parabellum. The P.08 was the usual side arm for German Army personnel in both World Wars.

The M1911 semi-automatic pistol set the standard for most modern handguns and likewise the mechanics of the handgun magazine. In most handguns the magazine follower engages a slide-stop to hold the slide back and keep the firearm out of battery when the magazine is empty and all rounds fired. Upon inserting a loaded magazine, the user depresses the slide stop, throwing the slide forward, stripping a round from the top of the magazine stack and chambering it. In single-action pistols this action keeps the hammer cocked back as the new round is chambered, keeping the gun ready to begin firing again.

During World War One, detachable box magazines found favor, being used in all manner of firearms, such as pistols, light-machine guns, submachine guns, semi-automatic and automatic rifles. However, after the War to End All Wars, military planners failed to recognize the importance of automatic rifles and detachable box magazine concept, and instead maintained their traditional views and preference for clip-fed bolt-action rifles. As a result, many promising new automatic rifle designs that used detachable box magazines were abandoned.

As World War II loomed, most of the world's major powers began to develop submachine guns fed by 20- to 40-round detachable box magazines. However, of the major powers, only the United States would adopt a general-issue semi-automatic rifle that used detachable box magazines: the M1 carbine with its 15-round magazines. As the war progressed the Germans developed the Sturmgewehr 44 assault rifle concept with its 30-round detachable magazine. After WWII, automatic weapons using detachable box magazines were developed and used by all of the world's armies. Today, detachable box magazines are the norm and they are so widely used that they are simply referred to as magazines or "mags" for short.

Function and types

All cartridge-based single-barrel firearms designed to fire more than a single shot without reloading require some form of magazine designed to store and feed cartridges to the firearm's action. Magazines come in many shapes and sizes, with the most common type in modern firearms being the detachable box type. Most magazines designed for use with a reciprocating bolt firearm (tube fed firearms being the exception) make use of a set of feed lips which stop the vertical motion of the cartridges out of the magazine but allow one cartridge at a time to be pushed forward (stripped) out of the feed lips by the firearm's bolt into the chamber. Some form of spring and follower combination is almost always used to feed cartridges to the lips which can be located either in the magazine (most removable box magazines) or built into the firearm (fixed box magazines). There are also two distinct styles to feed lips. In a single-feed design the top cartridge touches both lips and is commonly used in single-column box magazines, while a staggered feed magazine (sometimes called double-feed magazine, not to be confused with the firearm malfunction) consists of a wider set of lips so that the second cartridge in line forces the top cartridge against one lip. The staggered-feed design has proven more resistant to jamming in use with double-column magazines than single-feed variants, since the narrowing of a magazine tube to a single-feed induces extra friction which the magazine springs needs to overcome. Some magazine types are strongly associated with certain firearm types, such as the fixed "tubular" magazine found on most lever-action rifles and pump-action shotguns. A firearm using detachable magazines may accept a variety of types of magazine, such as the Thompson submachine gun, most variations of which would accept box or drum magazines. Some types of firearm, such as the M249 and other squad automatic weapons, can feed from both magazines and belts.

Tubular

Many of the first repeating rifles, particularly lever-action rifles, used magazines that stored cartridges nose-to-end inside of a spring-loaded tube typically running parallel under the barrel, or in the buttstock.  Tubular magazines are also commonly used in pump-action shotguns and .22 caliber bolt-action rimfire rifles such as the Marlin Model XT.  Tubular magazines and centerfire cartridges with pointed (spitzer) bullets present a safety issue: a pointed bullet may (through the forces of recoil or simply rough handling) strike the next round's primer and ignite that round, or even cause a chain ignition of other rounds, within the magazine.  The Winchester '73 used blunt-nosed centerfire cartridges as the .44-40 Winchester.  Certain modern rifle cartridges using soft pointed plastic tips have been designed to avoid this problem while improving the aerodynamic qualities of the bullet to match those available in bolt-action designs, thus extending the effective range of lever-actions.

Box

The most popular type of magazine in modern rifles and handguns, a box magazine stores cartridges in a column, either one above the other or in staggered zigzag fashion. This zigzag stack is often identified as a double-column or double-stack (The double-stack is much more common because of its ability to store more rounds), since a single staggered column is actually two side-by-side vertical columns offset by half of the diameter of a round. As the firearm cycles, cartridges are moved to the top of the magazine by a follower driven by spring compression to either a single-feed (center-feed) position or side-by-side (staggered-feed) positions. Box magazines may be integral to the firearm or removable.
 An internal box, integral box or fixed magazine (also known as a blind box magazine when lacking a floorplate) is built into the firearm and is not easily removable. This type of magazine is found most often on bolt-action rifles. An internal box magazine is usually charged through the action, one round at a time. Military rifles often use stripper clips, a.k.a. chargers, permitting multiple rounds, commonly 5 or 10 at a time, to be loaded in rapid sequence. Some internal box magazines use en bloc clips that are loaded into the magazine with the ammunition and that are ejected from the firearm when empty.
 A detachable box magazine is a self-contained mechanism capable of being loaded or unloaded while detached from the host firearm. They are attached via a slot in the firearm receiver, usually below the action (BAR, MP 40, AK 47, and M16), to the side of the action, (Sten, FG 42, Johnson LMG, Sterling, and M249) or on top of the action (Madsen machine gun, Bren gun, Owen gun, and P90). When necessary, the magazine can easily be detached from the firearm and replaced by another. This significantly speeds the process of reloading, allowing the operator quick access to ammunition. This type of magazine may be straight or curved, the curve being necessary if the rifle uses rimmed ammunition or ammunition with a tapered case. Detachable box magazines may be metal or plastic. The plastic magazines are sometimes partially transparent so the operator can easily check the remaining ammunition. Box magazines are often affixed to each other with clamps, clips, tape, straps, or built-in studs to facilitate faster reloading: see jungle style.

There are, however, exceptions to these rules. The Lee–Enfield rifle had a detachable box magazine only to facilitate cleaning. The Lee–Enfield magazine did open, permitting rapid unloading of the magazine without having to operate the bolt-action repeatedly to unload the magazine. Others, like the Breda Modello 30, had a fixed protruding magazine that resembled a conventional detachable box but was non-detachable.

Pistol magazines are often single- or double-stack with center-feed, which may be due to this design being slimmer at the top which can simplify the design of the pistol frame with regards to grip thickness. Some examples of pistols with staggered-feed are the Mauser C96, Stechkin APS, Steyr GB, HK VP70, QSZ-92, FN Five-seveN and GSh-18.

Horizontal

The FN P90 and Kel-Tec P50 personal defense weapons use horizontally mounted feeding systems. The magazine sits parallel to the barrel, fitting flush with the top of the receiver, and the ammunition is rotated 90 degrees by a spiral feed ramp before being chambered. The Heckler & Koch G11, an experimental assault rifle that implements caseless ammunition, also functions similarly with the magazine aligned horizontally over the barrel. Rather than being positioned laterally to the barrel like with the aforementioned examples, ammunition is positioned vertically with the bullet facing downward at a 90 degree angle relative to the barrel where it is fed into a rotary chamber before firing. The AR-57, also known as the AR Five-seven, is an upper receiver for the AR-15/M16 rifle lower receiver, firing FN 5.7×28mm rounds from standard FN P90 magazines.

Casket

Another form of box magazine, sometimes referred to as a "quad-column", can hold a large amount of ammunition.  It is wider than a standard box magazine, but retains the same length. Casket magazines can be found on the Suomi KP/-31, Hafdasa C-4, Spectre M4, QCW-05 and on 5.45×39mm AK rifle derivatives. Magpul has been granted a patent for a STANAG-compatible casket magazine, and such a magazine was also debuted by SureFire in December 2010, and is now sold as the MAG5-60 and MAG5-100 high capacity magazine (HCM) in 60 and 100 round capacities, respectively, in 5.56mm for AR-15 compatible with M4/M16/AR-15 variants and other firearms that accept STANAG 4179 magazines. Izhmash has also developed a casket magazine for the AK-12.

Rotary

The rotary (or spool) magazine consists of a cylindrical sprocket actuated by a torsion spring, with cartridges fitting between the tooth bar of the sprocket, which is mounted on a spindle parallel to the bore axis and rotates each round sequentially into the feeding position.  Rotary magazines may be fixed or detachable, and are usually of low capacity under ten rounds, depending on the caliber used.  John Smith patented a rotary magazine in 1856. Another rotary magazine was produced by Sylvester Roper in 1866 and was also used in the weapons by Anton Spitalsky and the Savage Model 1892.  Otto Schönauer first patented a spool magazine in 1886 and his later design, patented in 1900, was used on bolt-action rifles produced at least until 1979, among them Mannlicher–Schönauer adopted by the Greek Army in 1903. The M1941 Johnson rifle also uses a rotary magazine. The design is still used in some modern firearms, most notably the Ruger American series, the semi-automatic Ruger 10/22, the bolt-action Ruger 77/22 and the Steyr SSG 69.

Drum

Drum magazines are used primarily for light machine guns. In one type, a moving partition within a cylindrical chamber forces loose rounds into an exit slot, with the cartridges being stored parallel to the axis of rotation. After loading of the magazine, a wound spring or other mechanism forces the partition against the rounds. In all models a single staggered column is pushed by a follower through a curved path. From there the rounds enter the vertical riser either from a single or dual drums. Cylindrical designs such as rotary and drum magazines allow for larger capacity than box magazines, without growing to excessive length. The downside of a drum magazine's extra capacity is its added weight that, combined with the gun, can affect handling and prolonged use. Drum magazines can be more difficult to incorporate into combat gear compared to more regular, rectangular box magazines.

Many drum-fed firearms can also load from conventional box magazines, such as the Soviet PPSh-41 submachine gun, RPK light machine gun, and the American Thompson submachine gun.

The term "drum" is sometimes applied to a belt box for a belt-fed machine gun, though this is just a case that houses a length of ammunition belt, not a drum magazine.

Saddle-drum

Before WWII the Germans developed 75-round saddle-drum magazines for use in their MG 13 and MG 15 machine guns. The MG 34 machine guns could also use saddle-drum magazine when fitted with a special feed cover. The 75 rounds of ammunition were evenly distributed in each side of the magazine with a central feed "tower" where the ammunition is fed to the bolt. The ammunition was fed by a spring force, with rounds alternating from each side of the double drum so that the gun would not become unbalanced.

Pan

The pan magazine differs from other circular magazines in that the cartridges are stored perpendicular to the axis of rotation, rather than parallel, and are usually mounted on top of the firearm. This type is used on the Lewis Gun, Vickers K, Bren Gun (only used in anti-aircraft mountings), Degtyaryov light machine gun, and American-180 submachine gun. A highly unusual example was found on the Type 89 machine gun fed from two 45-round quadrant-shaped pan magazines (each magazine had a place for nine 5-round stripper clips).

Helical

Helical magazines extend the drum magazine design so that rounds follow a spiral path around an auger-shaped rotating follower or drive member, allowing for large ammunition capacity in a relatively compact package (compared to a regular box magazine of similar capacity). Early helical magazine designs include that patented by an unidentified inventor through the patent agent William Edward Newton in 1857 and the internal magazine of the Evans Repeating Rifle, patented in the late 1860s. This type of magazine is used by the Calico M960, PP-19 Bizon, CS/LS06 and KBP PP90M1. The North Korean military uses a 100- to 150- round helical magazine in the Type 88 assault rifle. Helical magazines offer substantially more ammunition carriage, however they are inherently complex designs. As such, they can be difficult to load and may decrease the reliability of feeding the weapon.

STANAG magazine

A STANAG magazine or NATO magazine is a type of detachable magazine proposed by NATO in October 1980. Shortly after NATO's acceptance of the 5.56×45mm NATO rifle cartridge, Draft Standardization Agreement (STANAG) 4179 was proposed in order to allow NATO members to easily share rifle ammunition and magazines down to the individual soldier level. The U.S. M16 rifle magazine was proposed for standardization. Many NATO members subsequently developed or purchased rifles with the ability to accept this type of magazine. However, the standard was never ratified and remains a "Draft STANAG".

The STANAG magazine concept is only an interface, dimensional, and control (magazine latch, bolt stop, etc.) requirement. Therefore, it not only allows one type of magazine to interface with various weapon systems, but also allows STANAG magazines to be made in various configurations and capacities. The standard STANAG magazines are 20, 30, and 40 round box magazines, but there are many other designs available with capacities ranging from 1 round to 60 and 100 round casket magazines, 90 round snail-drum magazines, and 100 round and 150 round double-drum magazines.

High-capacity magazines

In the United States, a number of states have passed laws that ban magazines which are defined as "high-capacity" by statute. High-capacity or large-capacity magazines are generally those defined by statute to be capable of holding more than 10 to 15 rounds, although the definitions vary. Other nations impose restrictions on magazine capacity as well. In Canada, magazines are generally limited to 5 rounds for rifles and 10 for handguns (with some exceptions), depending on the firearm.

See also

 Belt (firearms)
 Bottom metal
 Jungle style (firearm magazines)
 List of 3D printed weapons and parts

References

Further reading

External links

 Difference Between a Magazine and a Clip video
 Difference Between a Magazine and a Clip – Picture

 
Firearm components